Matúš Rais (born 21 November 1990) is a Slovak professional ice hockey player who currently playing for HK Levice of the Slovenská hokejová liga.

Rais previously played for HC 21 Prešov, Gentofte Stars, ŠHK 37 Piešťany, and HC Topoľčany.

Career statistics

Regular season and playoffs

International

References

External links

 

1990 births
Living people
Slovak ice hockey defencemen
ŠHK 37 Piešťany players
HK Nitra players
Sportspeople from Nitra
HC 07 Detva players
HC 21 Prešov players
HK Levice players
Expatriate ice hockey players in Denmark
Slovak expatriate ice hockey people
Slovak expatriate sportspeople in Denmark